Keith Jules Dancy (June 30, 1929 – May 6, 2001) was a Canadian hockey announcer.

Dancy's broadcasting career began in 1945 when he was hired as an announcer at CFRB in Toronto, Ontario. Later, he became the play-by-play man for the Montreal Canadiens.

Dancy was a colour commentator on Hockey Night in Canada from 1952 to 1966, mostly calling games involving the Montreal Canadiens. He was a colour commentator for 10 Stanley Cup broadcasts, including CBC's first 8 Stanley Cups along with his partner Danny Gallivan at Hockey Night in Canada, and the pair also was in the booth for eight National Hockey League All-Star Games.

After his broadcasting career ended, he became president of Rogers Broadcasting. He later launched his own company in the Niagara Region, owning and operating CFLZ-FM and CJRN in Niagara Falls and CKEY-FM in Fort Erie until his death. He died in hospital at Niagara-on-the-Lake, Ontario in 2001 at the age of 71 from cancer.

References

"Broadcast Dialogue", May 10, 2001 
Radio Station History - CFLZ-FM

Canadian radio sportscasters
Canadian television sportscasters
Canadian radio executives
National Hockey League broadcasters
Montreal Canadiens announcers
People from the Regional Municipality of Niagara
1930 births
2001 deaths